HMS Britannia, also known as Old Ironsides, was a 100-gun first-rate ship of the line of the Royal Navy.

Construction
She was ordered on 25 April 1751 from Portsmouth Dockyard to the draught specified in the 1745 Establishment. She was built by Thomas Bucknall. Her keel was laid down on 1 July 1751 and she was launched on 19 October 1762. The cost of building and fitting totalled £45,844/2s/8d. Her main gundeck armament of twenty-eight 42-pounder guns was later replaced by 32-pounders. In the 1790s ten of her quarterdeck guns and two of her forecastle guns were replaced by the same number of 32-pounder carronades. She was third of seven ships to bear the name Britannia.

Service
Britannia was first commissioned in August 1778, under the command of Captain Charles Morice Pole, for the American Revolutionary War. The ship was the flagship of Vice-Admiral George Darby between April 1779 and June, at which point Rear-Admiral Sir John Lockhart-Ross replaced Darby. Britannia was coppered at Portsmouth Dockyard in January 1780, and in September Captain James Bradby assumed command. He was in turn replaced by Captain Benjamin Hall in April 1782, with Britannia being paid off in February the following year. The ship underwent a repair at Portsmouth between May 1788 and September 1790 at the cost of £35,573.

Britannia was recommissioned for the French Revolutionary War in January 1793, under the command of Captain John Holloway. She was appointed flagship to Vice-Admiral William Hotham, and sailed for the Mediterranean Sea on 11 May. There she fought in the Battle of Genoa on 14 March 1795, and at the Battle of the Hyères Islands on 13 July. In January the following year Holloway was replaced in command by Captain Shuldham Peard as the ship became flagship to Vice-Admiral Hyde Parker, and Peard handed over to Captain Thomas Foley in May. Vice-Admiral Charles Thompson took Britannia as his flagship early in 1797, and as such the ship fought at the Battle of Cape St. Vincent on 14 February, in which she had one man wounded.

In March Captain Sir Charles Knowles replaced Foley, and Captain Edward March in turn replaced him in around June. The ship was then paid off in December. In 1800 Britannia was adapted to become a convalescence ship, and she then underwent a repair between June 1801 and January 1802 at the cost of £21,739. With the Napoleonic Wars having begun, the ship was then recommissioned by Captain Lord Northesk in April 1803 to serve on the Brest blockade. In April 1804 Northesk was promoted to rear-admiral, and Britannia became his flagship with Captain Charles Bullen assuming command in June. On 21 October 1805 Britannia fought in the windward column of the British fleet at the Battle of Trafalgar, in which she had ten men killed and a further forty-two wounded. Then in 1806 the ship was laid up in the Hamoaze.

On 6 January 1810 Britannia was renamed Princess Royal, and then again to Saint George on 18 January 1812. By 1813 Saint George was in ordinary in Plymouth Dockyard, and there between October and December she was converted into a prison ship. In the following year she was recommissioned in that role, under the command of Lieutenant John Cawkit. The ship then underwent another refit between March and June 1815 to enable her to serve as a receiving ship and flagship. In March she was recommissioned under the command of Captain James Nash, becoming the flagship of Admiral Sir John Duckworth, Commander-in-Chief, Plymouth. Saint George was paid off in December and renamed to Barfleur on 2 June 1819. Ordered to be broken up after this, the process was completed on 25 February 1825.

Notes

References

Lavery, Brian (2003) The Ship of the Line – Volume 1: The development of the battlefleet 1650–1850. Conway Maritime Press. .

External links
 

Ships of the line of the Royal Navy
Ships built in Portsmouth
1762 ships